Bogue Fallah is a stream in the U.S. state of Mississippi.

Bogue Fallah is a name derived from the Choctaw language meaning "long creek".

References

Rivers of Mississippi
Rivers of Choctaw County, Mississippi
Rivers of Oktibbeha County, Mississippi
Mississippi placenames of Native American origin